("The Wicander Charity Shield") was a Swedish football cup tournament played between 1905 and 1916, a match was also planned to be played in 1920, but was not. The idea for the tournament came from the English Charity Shield trophy, and in the same way as the English match, profits from the matches in the Swedish tournament were given to various charities.

Previous winners

Cup champions

Sources
 DIFarkivet.se: Wicanderska Välgörenhetsskölden 

Defunct football competitions in Sweden
1905 establishments in Sweden
1916 disestablishments in Sweden
Recurring sporting events established in 1905